Diario de Yucatán is a major, regional Mexican daily newspaper headquartered in Mérida, Yucatán. The newspaper covers the three Mexican states of the Yucatán Peninsula - Yucatán, Campeche, and Quintana Roo. Diario de Yucatán, which was launched on May 31, 1925 by Carlos R. Menéndez, has a daily circulation of approximately 70,000 copies.

See also
 List of newspapers in Mexico

References

External links
Diario de Yucatán
Grupo Megamedia

Newspapers published in Mexico
Publications established in 1925
Mass media in Mérida, Yucatán
Spanish-language newspapers
1925 establishments in Mexico